"I Concentrate on You" is a song written by Cole Porter for the 1940 film Broadway Melody of 1940, where it was introduced by Douglas McPhail.

Notable recordings
Franck Amsallem - Amsallem Sings (2009)
Fred Astaire - The Astaire Story (1952)
Tony Bennett - Steppin' Out (1993)
Freddy Cole - Rio de Janeiro Blue (2009)
Perry Como - TV Favorites (1952), Easy Listening (1970)
Ray Conniff - Rhapsody in Rhythm  (1962), The very best of Ray Conniff  (2017)
Ella Fitzgerald - Ella Fitzgerald Sings the Cole Porter Songbook (1956), Ella Loves Cole (1972)
The Four Freshmen - Live in the New Millennium  (2002)
Tony Bennett and Lady Gaga recorded a version of the song for their 2021 collaborative album Love for Sale.
Judy Garland - Judy in Love (1958)
Bunky Green - Healing the Pain (1990)
Grant Green – Nigeria (1962)
Johnny Hartman - Thank You for Everything (1998), rec. 1976
Lena Horne - Lena...Lovely and Alive (1962)
Stan Kenton - Back to Balboa (1958)
Russell Malone - Wholly Cats (1996)
Carmen McRae - When You're Away (1959), Recorded Live at Bubba's (1981)
Oscar Peterson - Oscar Peterson Plays the Cole Porter Songbook (1959)
Tito Puente - Revolving Bandstand (1960)
Dianne Reeves - A Little Moonlight (2003)
Frank Sinatra - Songs by Sinatra (1950), Sinatra's Swingin' Session!!! (1961), Francis Albert Sinatra & Antonio Carlos Jobim (1967)
Joanie Sommers - The "Voice" of the Sixties! (1958)
Jeri Southern - Meets Cole Porter/at the Crescendo (1997)
Mel Tormé - Mel Tormé Sings About Love (1958), A Day in the Life of Bonnie and Clyde (1968)
Dinah Washington - released as a single in 1955, peaking at #11 on the Best Sellers in Stores chart and included on I Concentrate on You (1960)
Dionne Warwick

References
Song Search Results for: I CONCENTRATE ON YOU  - allmusic, retrieved June 26, 2010
Jazzstandards.com - I Concentrate on You, retrieved June 26, 2010

Songs written by Cole Porter
Frank Sinatra songs
Ella Fitzgerald songs
Judy Garland songs
Lena Horne songs
Carmen McRae songs
1940 songs